William H. Hemschemeyer was a member of the Wisconsin State Assembly.

Biography
Hemschemeyer was born in Stolzenau, then in Prussia. Reports have differed on the date. During the American Civil War, he enlisted with the 26th Wisconsin Volunteer Infantry Regiment of the Union Army. He would later achieve the rank of captain. Hemschemeyer died on November 18, 1894.

Political career
Hemschemeyer was a member of the Assembly in 1879 and 1880. Other positions he held include alderman and city clerk of Manitowoc, Wisconsin. In 1868, he was a candidate for Sheriff of Manitowoc County, Wisconsin. He was a Republican.

References

People from Nienburg (district)
People from Manitowoc, Wisconsin
Republican Party members of the Wisconsin State Assembly
Wisconsin city council members
City and town clerks
People of Wisconsin in the American Civil War
Union Army officers
Union Army soldiers
1894 deaths
Burials in Wisconsin